Bursaria occidentalis is a species of flowering plant in the family Pittosporaceae and is endemic to Western Australia. It is a spiny tree or shrub with egg-shaped adult leaves, flowers with relatively small, hairy sepals and five spreading creamy-white petals, and inflated capsules.

Description

Taxonomy
Bursaria occidentalis was first formally described in 1978 by Eleanor Marion Bennett in the journal Nuytsia from specimens she collected near Shark Bay in 1975.

Distribution and habitat
This bursaria grows in mallee woodland between Shark Bay, Dongara and Menzies in the Avon Wheatbelt, Coolgardie, Geraldton Sandplains, Murchison and Yalgoo biogeographic regions of Western Australia. In some places it may be the only tree species.

References

External links 
 Bursaria occidentalis occurrence data from the Australasian Virtual Herbarium

Pittosporaceae
occidentalis
Eudicots of Western Australia
Plants described in 1978